This table presents the list of top scorers in Indonesian football competitions, in particular since the establishment of Liga Indonesia in 1994, during their all-time career in Indonesia. In the period of 1994–2007 the top flight league in Indonesia was the Premier Division which was then replaced by Indonesia Super League and later became Liga 1.

Top scorers by season

Note

All-time top scorers

Players in bold are still active in Liga 1.

References
 Liga Indonesia Website
 List of Liga Indonesia Champions in RSSSF.com

all
scorers
Association football player non-biographical articles